Al-Qarah Mountain or Jabal Al-Qārah, also known as "Al-Shabaab Mountain", is a mesa of  in Al-Ahsa, in the Eastern Province of Saudi Arabia. This mountain counts as one of the most important natural sights in Al-Ahsa, and was registered in the UNESCO world heritage center's list in 2018, after the inclusion of Al-Ahsa Oasis. Some of its caves, such as "Al-Nashab", have moderately steady temperatures throughout the year.

Naming 
The mountain is named after the village of Al-Qarah. It is also sometimes called "Al-Shaba'an", because it is situated among palm trees and rivers, and it has wild high caves which are cold in the summer. It is likely that the first inhabitants of Al-Qarah village were a pre-Islamic tribe who were skilled at archery. However, it appears from the site's landform that it was referred to as a "black, small, single, round and high mountain." Moreover, some historians and travelers stated in their books that the mountain was called "Al-Mushaqqar". However, in his book "Geographical Dictionary of Saudi Arabia - Eastern Province - Section Four", the historian Hamed Al-Jaser mentioned different opinions about the location of Al-Mushaqqar, with some having said that "Al-Mushaqqar" was in Al-Hijaz, in the valley of Eja'a, one of the Tae'a Mountains, or in a Bahraini fort, and the last one is most popular. While Abdul-Khaleq Al-Janbi confirmed that Al-Qarah was named by that, because its south is connected to a huge, strange shape, and a hill formation with caves of various sizes, there is also a big rock above it, and it is carved in an unusual way. In total, it has three heads, the first one is to south, and it looks like a woman's head. The second one is to the north, and looks like a man's head. The third one between them looks like a lion. This part of the mountain is called "Ra'as Al-Qarah", as mentioned by Arabic geographers. Al-Janbi said in his book that it was "a divine formation", which was not influenced by human activity. "Al-Mushaqqar" was also mentioned in the fourth section of "Mou'jam Ma Esta'ajam", a dictionary by Abu Ubaid Al-Bakry. Ibn Al-E'erabi said "Al-Mushaqqar: a great ancient city, has a fortress in the middle, on Al-Qarah called Attalah, and on the top of it, there is a well that has a hole, until it gets to the ground, so it is absorbed by the ground. All Hajer water is excluded in that well, in its increasing ..."

Geographical location 
The mountain is located in Al-Ahsa Oasis, between four villages: Al-Qarah, At-Tuwaitheer, Ad-Dalwah and At-Tihemeah.

Geology 
Several types of the mountain's caves extend in a form of ribbed grids of cracked ground, while the others are cavities due to chemical weathering, the process of abrasion, and collapses.

Caves and Cavities 
There are 3 types of caves in the mountain:

1- First type formed due to the dissolving and abrasion process of water-soluble rocks, and it is the most common type of limestone cave detected in Saudi Arabia.

2- Second type is a result of collapses of the upper layers because of chemical weathering and abrasion, therefore, the removal of lower layers lead to the formation of wide caves sometimes. The most famous cave of this type is located at the west of the mountain, and it is called "Al-Eid Cave", or "Maqarat Al-Eid", in which the events accompanying with collective wedding take a place there, and it are held annually.

3- Third type is formed because of earthquake Fissures and it is a cavernous system that takes a regular form of straight fissures, and corridors like.

The most famous cave of this type is Al-Nashab cave which has been invested by Ahsa Tourism company under the name "Land of Civilizations project in Al-Qarah mountain". Each one of the caves has natural characteristics which made the locals take advantage of it based on their usage like the annual collective wedding, and other activities for tourists. 
among the most famous caves in the mountain is:
 Bu Saleh (Al-Mahdi)
 Al-Eid
 An-Naqa
 Al-Mua'adhamah
 Al-Maheub
 Al-Gairan
 An-Nashab
 Um Al-Jamajem

Formation of caves  
There is a popular belief that the caves in the mountain formed as a result of tides, based on a study that was done in 1978, however, in 2006 another study denied this allegation.

Renovation and tourism investment works 
Until 2016, Al-Qarah was one of the responsibilities of Al ahsa municipality, despite the useless repeated attempts to register it at the list of UNESCO world heritage centre, after that, Ahsa Tourism company "Ahsana" invested the mountain to develop it as a modern tourist facility. The tourism projects' cost which was done by the company was about 100 million Saudi Riyal. The project named "Land of Civilizations", and the project includes preparing the main cave, lighting and leveling its ground. It also includes the museum of history of Hajer "Al Ahsa name formerly", stepped theater, new cafes, and shops. This contributed to holding weekly activates, between cultural evenings, music, arts, and visual shows.

Climate 
The reason for the regular temperature is the thermal insulation of the rocks and the caves are not exposed to direct sun. Also, from the cool airflow, the difference in temperature difference between inside the cave and outside ...

History 

The mountain was inhabited by the tribe of Bani Muhareb from Abdul-Qais till the third century in the Hijri calendar. Because of the different terrain of each cave, the caves used by the residents in the past and until now like Al-Eid Cave for weddings, Al-Nashab cave for tourism, and Um Al-Jamajem cave which recently used for hiking trips since the end of 2019.

Education 
The caves were used as a place for education before the Formal education, so the teachers were gathering the children at the courtyards of the mountain or at the entrances of the caves, to teach them reading Al-Qur’an One of the habits that were popular in the past, that the people of close villages were burring their special documents in the mountain, so the mountain has a lot of valuable documents and the histories of some families of Al-Ahsa.

References

See also 
 Eastern Arabia

Al-Ahsa Governorate
Mountains of Saudi Arabia